Bozoğlak, also known as Berete,  is a village in the Baskil District of Elazığ Province in Turkey. The village had a population of 80 in 2021. The hamlet of Dolma is attached to the village.

Founded by the Bucak of Muşar, the village is mostly populated by Kurds.

References

Villages in Baskil District
Kurdish settlements in Elazığ Province